The Roman Catholic Archdiocese of Kasama is the Metropolitan See for the Ecclesiastical province of Kasama in Zambia.

History
 January 28, 1913: Established as Apostolic Vicariate of Bangueolo from the Apostolic Vicariate of Nyassa in Malawi.
 May 23, 1933: Mission of Lwangwa is separated.
 July 10, 1952: Western part of the vicariate became Apostolic Prefecture of Fort Rosebery, eastern part becomes Apostolic Vicariate of Kasama.
 April 25, 1959: Promoted as Diocese of Kasama.
 June 12, 1967: Promoted as Metropolitan Archdiocese of Kasama.

Special churches
The seat of the archbishop is the Cathedral of St. John the Apostle in Kasama.

Bishops
 Vicars Apostolic of Bangueolo (Roman rite) 
 Bishop Etienne-Benoît Larue, M. Afr. (1913.01.28 – 1935.10.05)
 Bishop Alexandre-Auguste-Laurent-Marie Roy, M. Afr. (1935.10.05 – 1949.05.16)
 Vicar Apostolic of Kasama (Roman rite) 
 Bishop Marcel Daubechies, M. Afr. (1950.02.03 – 1959.04.25 see below)
 Bishops of Kasama (Roman rite) 
 Bishop Marcel Daubechies, M. Afr. (see above 1959.04.25 – 1964.11.25)
 Bishop Clemens P. Chabukasansha (1965.07.06 – 1967.06.12 see below)
 Metropolitan Archbishops of Kasama (Roman rite)
 Archbishop Clemens P. Chabukasansha (see above 1967.06.12 – 1973.02.22)
 Archbishop Elias White Mutale (1973.09.17 – 1990.02.12)
 Archbishop James Mwewa Spaita (1990.12.03 - 2009.04.30)
 Archbishop Ignatius Chama (since 2012.01.12)

Coadjutor Vicar Apostolic
Alexandre-Auguste-Laurent-Marie Roy, M. Afr. (1934-1935)

Other priest of this diocese who became bishop
Justin Mulenga, appointed Bishop of Mpika in 2015
Archbishop Tresphore G Mpundu Emeritus of Lusaka

Suffragan dioceses
 Mansa
 Mpika

See also
Roman Catholicism in Zambia
List of Roman Catholic dioceses in Zambia

Sources

 catholic-hierarchy

 GCatholic.org

Roman Catholic dioceses in Zambia
Christian organizations established in 1913
Roman Catholic dioceses and prelatures established in the 20th century
1913 establishments in Northern Rhodesia
Kasama, Zambia
Roman Catholic Ecclesiastical Province of Kasama